Reva Kay Williams is an American astrophysicist. Williams is the first Black American woman to receive a Ph.D. in theoretical astrophysics and the first person to successfully work out the Penrose process using Einstein's Theory of Relativity to extract energy from black holes.

Early life and education 
Williams was born in Memphis, Tennessee and moved to Chicago at the age of 6. She received an A.A. in liberal arts from Malcolm X College in 1977 and a B.A. in astronomy from Northwestern University in 1980. Williams completed both a M.A. and a Ph.D. at Indiana University Bloomington, and when she completed her degree in 1991 she became the first Black American woman to receive a doctorate in astrophysics.

Penrose process
With the publication of her Ph.D. thesis in 1991, Williams became the first person to work out the Penrose process of black holes. In 1995, Williams published a paper in Physical Review of research from her Ph.D. thesis. Her calculations explained that black hole jets are emitted as escaping tornado-like coils of high energy photons and relativistic electrons, and when black holes drag spacetime into rotation near their cores, they may also produce uneven jets.

In April 2004, Williams published a letter titled A Word from a Black Female Relativistic Astrophysicist: Setting the Record Straight on Black Holes addressing her experience with breakthrough black hole physics and not receiving appropriate citations and others taking credit for her work.

Postdoctoral career

Williams was awarded a National Research Council Ford postdoctoral minority fellowship and was a postdoctoral associate at the University of Florida from 1993-1996. In January 1997, she worked as a visiting assistant professor of physics at North Carolina Agricultural and Technical State University (North Carolina A&T), and in 1998, she became an associate professor of astrophysics and Director of the Center for Women and Science at Bennett College, remaining in that position until 2001.

In 2000, Williams received a grant to work with Robert M. Hjellming in Aspen, Colorado and Socorro, New Mexico studying microquasars. At that time, she was the only Black American female astrophysicist in the United States, and as of 2004 was one of the few women in the world researching black holes.

In 2009, she was awarded a National Science Foundation grant to "investigate the jet structure and energy generation of quasars and other active galactic nuclei (AGNs), microquasars, and gamma-ray bursters, all of which are believed to be powered by rotating (Kerr) black holes."

Since 2009, Williams has been a research assistant professor at the University of Toledo. Her continuing research interests are relativistic astrophysics, general relativity, cosmology, and extragalactic astronomy.

Williams gave a plenary speech at the astrobiology conference, AbSciCon, in the spring of 2022, organized by American Geophysical Union and NASA.

Selected publications

References 

Women astrophysicists
African-American women scientists
University of Florida faculty
University of Toledo faculty
Indiana University Bloomington alumni
Year of birth missing (living people)
Living people
American astrophysicists
People from Memphis, Tennessee
Scientists from Tennessee
Malcolm X College alumni
Northwestern University alumni
Bennett College faculty
American women academics
21st-century African-American people
21st-century African-American women